Russell Mark Jeung is an Asian American sociologist at San Francisco State University. He is known for his social activism on racism towards Asian Americans and is a co-founder of Stop AAPI Hate.

Biography 
Jeung obtained both his Bachelor of Arts in Human Biology and Master of Arts in Education at Stanford University in 1984. He further completed a M.A. in Sociology (1995) and a Ph.D. in Sociology at the UC Berkeley (2000). His Ph.D. dissertation, entitled "Emerging Asian American Pan-Ethnic Congregations: The Religious Construction of Symbolic Racial Identity" was later published by Rutgers University Press, with the new title Faithful Generations: Race and new Asian American Churches.

After teaching at Foothill College for two years, he joined the Department of Asian American Studies, San Francisco State University in 2002 and is current Professor at the Department.

Community activism 
Jeung is involved in a number of community projects, seeing his activism as a way to live out his Christian religion.

He and Valerie Soe produced The Oak Park Story, a 2010 documentary about his faith-based community organizing in East Oakland among Cambodians and Latinos. It was a Blue Ribbon Award Semi-Finalist.

Jeung is known for helping to launch Stop AAPI Hate in March 2020, in coalition with leaders Cynthia Choi of Chinese for Affirmative Action and Manjusha P. Kulkarni from AAPI Equity Alliance as a response to the increase of racism against Asian Americans during COVID-19. The project provides community resources to assist drafting policy to fight against racism and bullying. Time magazine has named Jeung, together with Kulkarni and Choi, among the 100 most influential people of 2021, for they "have locked arms with other BIPOC organizations to find restorative justice measures so that civil rights—for all vulnerable groups—receive the protection they deserve."

Works 
 Jeung, Russell, Karen Umemoto, Harvey Dong, Eric Mar, Lisa Hirai Tsuchitani, and Arnold Pan (2019). Mountain Movers: Student Activism & the Emergence of Asian American Studies. Los Angeles: UCLA Asian American Studies Center. ISBN 9780934052542
 Jeung, Russell, Seanan S. Fong, and Helen Jin Kim (2019). Family Sacrifices: The Worldviews and Ethics of Chinese Americans. New York: Oxford University Press. ISBN 9780190875923
 Jeung, Russell (2016). At Home in Exile: Finding Jesus among My Ancestors and Refugee Neighbors. Grand Rapids, MI: Zondervan. ISBN 9780310527831
 Chen, Carolyn and Russell Jeung (2012). Sustaining Faith Traditions: Race, Ethnicity and Religion Among the Latino and Asian American Second Generation. New York: New York University Press. ISBN 9780814717363

References

External links 

 Faculty Page

Living people
San Francisco State University faculty
Stanford University alumni
University of California, Berkeley alumni
American sociologists
American academics of Chinese descent
Year of birth missing (living people)